R358 road may refer to:
 R358 road (Ireland)
 R358 road (South Africa)